Carrus (Latin for "cart" or "cartload") may refer to:

Units
 load, a unit of weight or mass

People
 Davide Carrus, an Italian soccer player
 Gerald Carrus, an American businessman who cofounded the Infinity Broadcasting Corporation

Other
 Carrus Oy, a Finnish former bus and coach manufacturer, and its successor Carrus Delta Oy.
 Carrus Navalis, part of the Aalborg Carnival

See also
 Car
 Chariot